Aristotelia veteranella is a moth of the family Gelechiidae. It was described by Zeller in 1877. It is found in Central America.

References

Moths described in 1877
Aristotelia (moth)
Moths of Central America